Michael "Mike" Rianda (born December 25, 1984) is an American writer, director, and voice actor. He is known for his work on Gravity Falls as a creative director and writer for season 1, and creative consultant for season 2. He is also known for directing, co-writing, and co-starring his feature directorial debut The Mitchells vs. the Machines (2021), for which he was nominated for the Academy Award for Best Animated Feature.

Early life and education 
Rianda was born on December 25, 1984, in Salinas, California. He attended the California Institute of the Arts after he "drew and said amusing things" in school, studying character animation. Rianda also started writing and directing two short films at the animation school titled Everybody Dies in 90 Seconds (2008) and Work (2010).

Career 
He became a creative director and writer on the Emmy Award-winning Disney Channel animated television series Gravity Falls, until his departure in 2013. Mike also voiced Lee, Thompson, Mr. Poolcheck, and the additional voices. Rianda later returned and served as a creative consultant for its second season.

In 2021, he directed and co-wrote, along with Jeff Rowe, The Mitchells vs. the Machines, in which he also voiced Aaron Mitchell. The film was released on Netflix on April 30, 2021.

Filmography

Film

Television

Awards and nominations

References

External links
 

Living people
1984 births
American cartoonists
American animated film directors
American male voice actors
American male television writers
Annie Award winners
Animators from California
People from Salinas, California
Sony Pictures Animation people